Federico Gastaldi (born 1964) is an Argentine businessman. He was the deputy team principal of the Lotus F1 Team, in 2014 and 2015.

Gastaldi was promoted to Deputy Team Principal on March 14, 2014, due to the Lotus F1 Team's need to reorganize its management after former team boss Éric Boullier left for McLaren. Prior to being promoted, he had been working at Lotus since the year 2010 as Director of Business Development with his most recent role in a long-standing relationship with the Enstone team. Previously, in the 1990s, Gastaldi was responsible for the interests of the Italian group Benetton in Argentina. He was also involved in conducting the Argentine Grand Prix between 1995 and 1998.

References

1964 births
Living people
Formula One team principals